Heterodera cardiolata is a plant pathogenic nematode.

References 

cardiolata
Plant pathogenic nematodes
Nematodes described in 1969